The first presidency of Emmanuel Macron started with his election in 2017.

Policy 
In 2017, Paris was selected for the 2024 Summer Olympics, after a bidding process that had started in 2015 during the Hollande presidency.

In 2018, the government announced the cancellation of the Aéroport du Grand Ouest project.

References 

Emmanuel Macron